Bríd Reid is a former camogie player, captain of the All Ireland Camogie Championship-winning team in 1959 and, unusually (for the time), returned by air from her honeymoon in England to captain the team to victory.

Career
She won five All Ireland senior medals in 1953, 1954, 1955, 1957 and 1958. She scored a dramatic last minute winning goal for Dublin against Antrim in the 1957 final.

References

External links
 Camogie.ie Official Camogie Association Website
 Wikipedia List of Camogie players

Dublin camogie players
Year of birth missing
Possibly living people